Kalinino is a rural locality (a village) in Sibaysky Selsoviet, Baymaksky District, Bashkortostan, Russia. The population was 388 as of 2010. There are 2 streets.

Geography 
Kalinino is located 41 km northeast of Baymak (the district's administrative centre) by road. Sibay is the nearest rural locality.

References 

Rural localities in Baymaksky District